Component System with the Auto Reverse (sometimes listed under the title A Tape Called Component System with the Auto Reverse) is the eighth studio album by rapper Open Mike Eagle. It was preceded by three singles: "Burner Account", "Multi-Game Arcade Cabinet", and "I'll Fight You". The album has been regarded as "easily one of Open Mike Eagle's most enjoyable efforts" and as "feel[ing] like the culmination" to his discography.

Background
Component System with the Auto Reverse was named in reference to the shelf stereo system, a machine that was popular in the late twentieth century for allowing radio listeners to compile and record mixtapes. During his adolescence in the 1990s, Eagle made many such mixtapes out of music he heard on college radio stations in his native Chicago. He consequently chose the name and aesthetic of this album as a reference to one such mixtape. The 1990s also inspired the visual direction of the album, which made reference to touchstones of the era such as VHS tapes and the retailer Circuit City.

Eagle has stated that his writing process on Component System with the Auto Reverse was "more about technique" than it had been on previous albums, and that he was deliberately seeking to "break creative thresholds" in a way he had not previously attempted. He describes the COVID-19 lockdowns of 2020 as having been psychologically challenging, and has stated that "exploring [his] craft" collaboratively with other rappers shaped his approach to he album.

Critical reception

At Metacritic, which assigns a weighted average score out of 100 to reviews from mainstream critics, Component System with the Auto Reverse received an average score of 83 based on 5 reviews, indicating "universal acclaim".

Component System was widely described by critics as featuring a looser structure and a more whimsical mood than Eagle's previous albums. Paul Simpson of Allmusic describes Eagle's lyrics as "raw, off the cuff, and unfiltered", while Tim Sentz of Beats Per Minute describes the album as "tender, chaotic, and messy". Matthew Ismael Ruiz of Pitchfork noted that the album's aesthetic was "raw but carefully considered". Eagle received particular praise for his ability to pivot between humorous and introspective content on the album. Pitchfork describes Eagle as using "a bittersweet sense of humor to soothe his painful awareness of the world's absurdity", Ryan Dillon of Glide commends Eagle's "switching between cartoonish raps and unshakable directness", and Noah Berlatsky of the Chicago Reader highlights Eagle's "loopy gags that float and bob and tie themselves together into surprisingly thoughtful reveries on aging, mental illness, disappointment, and hope". Eagle's technical skill on the album was also noted positively: critics described him as writing "tightly packed nerd raps" that were "filled with casually brilliant moments". The Glide review remarked that Eagle seemed to be more confident in his rapping skill than on previous releases. In a more mixed review, Ben Brutocao of HipHopDX stated that—although the first half of the album sported "some of the most sure-footed rapping" in Eagle's discography–the project's second half failed to reach the same level.

Sonically, the album was described as featuring "sample-rich production with... nostalgic low-end", as well as "smudgy, lo-fi beats" and "cranky boom-bap".

Track listing

References

2022 albums
Open Mike Eagle albums
Albums produced by Diamond D
Albums produced by Madlib
Albums produced by Quelle Chris
Hip hop albums by American artists